Richard West (born 19 July 1985) is a Jamaican footballer.

Playing career
West began playing in the KSAFA Super League with Santos F.C. in 2003. In 2004, he played in the country's top flight league the National Premier League with Waterhouse F.C., and won a JFF Champions Cup. The following season he signed with rivals Harbour View F.C. In 2006, he signed with Tivoli Gardens F.C. and during his tenure with the club he won the National Premier League in 2009, and the JFF Champions Cup in 2006. In 2011, he went overseas to Canada to sign with Brampton City United FC of the Canadian Soccer League. In his debut season he finished as the club's top goalscorer and the second highest goalscorer within the league with 17 goals. He helped the club secure a postseason berth by finishing fourth in the overall standings. He featured in the first round of the playoffs where they faced Serbian White Eagles, but were eliminated by a score of 8–0 on goals on aggregate.

In 2012, he signed with league powerhouse the Serbian White Eagles, and scored a goal in his debut match on 11 May 2012 against London City. He secured a postseason berth for the club by finishing sixth in the overall standings. In the quarterfinals of the playoffs he recorded the winning goal in a 1–0 victory against SC Toronto. In the next round the White Eagles faced their arch-rivals Toronto Croatia, but were eliminated by a score 4–0. The following season he was transferred over to York Region Shooters. In his debut season with York Region he finished as the club's top goalscorer with 19 goals, and finished as runners-up in the regular season. In the postseason the club faced London City, but suffered a defeat in penalties.

In the 2014 season he helped York Region achieve an undefeated season claiming the regular season title. In the postseason he contributed by scoring a goal in a 3–0 victory over Brampton. In the CSL Championship finals they faced Toronto Croatia where West scored the equalizing goal which sent the game to penalties where York Region won the shootout by a score of 5–4. In 2015, he won the CSL Golden Boot by finishing as the league's top goalscorer with 23 goals. In the postseason he scored a hat-trick in a 4–2 victory over Burlington SC. In the next round York Region were eliminated by Toronto Croatia by a score of 3–2.

In 2018, he signed with Unionville Milliken SC in League1 Ontario.

International career
West made his debut for the Jamaica national football team on 24 November 2004 in a Qualifying Caribbean Zone match against Saint Martin where he scored a goal in a 12–0 victory.

Honours

York Region Shooters
Canadian Soccer League First Division (2): 2014. 2016
CSL Championship (1): 2014
CSL Golden Boot: 2015

References

1985 births
Living people
Association football forwards
Jamaican footballers
Jamaica international footballers
Waterhouse F.C. players
Harbour View F.C. players
Tivoli Gardens F.C. players
Brampton United players
Serbian White Eagles FC players
York Region Shooters players
Canadian Soccer League (1998–present) players
National Premier League players
Santos F.C. (Jamaica) players
Unionville Milliken SC players